Rayudu/Raidu/Rayalu is a title used by South Indian Telugu castes such as Kapu (Telaga/Balija),   

Kamma and Velama. . Rayudu title is native to Andhra Pradesh and Karnataka states in India. Rayudu is a Telugu name and synonym for the word "Royal". The word "Rayudu" means "king", or "a man with rich background". In recent times, young people in Rayalaseema of Andhra Pradesh have been naming themselves "Royal/Rayal" instead of Rayudu/Rayalu. The terms Rayudu and Raidu spells same.

Notable people
 Ambati Rayudu, Indian cricketer
 Bathyala Changal Rayudu, politician
 Kothapalli Subba Rayudu, Indian politician, member of the Lok Sabha, and minister in Andhra Pradesh
 Rohit Rayudu, Indian cricketer
 Sugavasi Palakondrayudu, Indian politician, former member of the Lok Sabha and minister in Andhra Pradesh
 Tandra Papa Rayudu, army general of Bobbili princely state

References

Lists of people by surname